The Greatest Game Ever Played is a 2005 film based on the life of Francis Ouimet

The Greatest Game Ever Played may also refer to:
1947 All-Ireland Hurling Final, a hurling match between arch-rivals Cork and Kilkenny.
1958 NFL Championship Game, the National Football League championship game between the Baltimore Colts and the New York Giants
The 31 December 1975 tie game between the HC CSKA Moscow and the Montreal Canadiens during the 1976 Super Series 
Game 5 of the 1976 NBA Finals between the Boston Celtics and Phoenix Suns, tied for the longest NBA Finals game.
Australia in South Africa, 5th ODI, 2006, a cricket game where both teams broke the world record for highest team totals in an innings
Isner–Mahut match at the 2010 Wimbledon Championships, the 2010 Wimbledon Championships game at court 18
Second Test, 2000–01 Border–Gavaskar Trophy, Underdog India won the match by 171 runs after being forced to follow-on, only the third time this has happened since Test cricket began in 1877

See also:
The Game of the Century (disambiguation)